A stocking is an elastic garment covering the foot and lower part of the leg.

Stocking may also refer to:

 Stocking (forestry), a measure of tree density
 Stocking (surname), a surname
 Stocking, Austria, an Austrian municipality
 Stocking Creek, a stream in Minnesota
 Stocking Lake (disambiguation)
 Christmas stocking, a type of Christmas decoration
 Fish stocking, the practice of raising fish in a hatchery and releasing them into a river, lake, or ocean
 One of the three title characters of the anime series Panty & Stocking with Garterbelt
 Stocking, the white leg marking for horses

See also
 
 
 Stock (disambiguation)